The Commercial Office of Brazil to Taipei (Portuguese: Escritório Comercial do Brasil em Taipé) represents interests of Brazil in Taiwan in the absence of formal diplomatic relations, functioning as a de facto embassy. Its counterpart in Brazil is the Taipei Economic and Cultural Office in Brazil in Brasilia.

See also
 Brazil–Taiwan relations
 List of diplomatic missions in Taiwan
 List of diplomatic missions of Brazil

References

External links
 

Taipei
Brazil
Brazil–Taiwan relations